Steven Paul Holcomb (April 14, 1980 – May 6, 2017) was an American bobsledder who competed from 1998 until his death in 2017. At the 2010 Winter Olympics in Vancouver, he won the four-man bobsled event for the United States, its first gold medal in that event since 1948. At the 2014 Winter Olympics in Sochi, he finished second in both the four-man and two-man event.

Early career
Holcomb learned to ski when he was 2 years old. He was born in Park City, Utah, where his mother would take him skiing at every opportunity. He began ski racing when he was six at the main resort of Park City, and began ski racing for the Park City Ski Team for the following twelve years. During this time he was also an athlete in local sports, playing soccer, football, basketball, baseball, and running track. In 1998 he participated in a local USA bobsled team try-out and scored enough points to be invited to the National Team Camp, which included the National Push Championships. He finished in eighth place and was invited to stay for an additional week to train with the National Team. Despite his eighth-place finish, which qualified him for the national team, he was not selected because of his small stature and young age.

After placing 5th at the National Team Trials in early October 1998 at the Utah Olympic Park, he chose to attend the University of Utah. Shortly following the naming of the American 1998 IBSF Bobsleigh World Cup team, an injury caused the withdrawal of one member. On November 3, 1998, he was asked to join the World Cup team in Calgary, Alberta, for the first World Cup race, where he pushed for driver Brian Shimer. He then went on to have an above average career as a pusher for drivers Jim Herberich, Mike Dionne, Todd Hays, and Brian Shimer. Shortly before the 2002 Winter Olympics, Holcomb was cut from Brian Shimer's team, and replaced with Dan Steele, a veteran from the 1998 Winter Olympics. At the Utah Olympic Park for the 2002 Winter Olympics, he served as a bobsled forerunner, who tests the bobsled course prior to competition.

Starting with the 2004–2005 season, he achieved second and third ranked American driver. Holcomb left the military with an honorable discharge in June 2006, and focused on competition on the World Cup circuit. This led to immediate results in the 2006–07 season, where Holcomb (with team members Jovanovic and Kreitzburg) won the two-man World Cup Championship, while he finished second in the four-man competition (with Jovanovic, Kreitzburg, and Mesler), which earned Holcomb the overall Combined Championship.

As Holcomb rose through the ranks of American bobsledders, the degenerative eye disease Keratoconus, initially diagnosed in 2002, began to affect his daily life and competitive skills, which led to depression. In 2007, a non-invasive surgical procedure, corneal collagen cross-linking (C3-R), was performed to stabilize the disease, and in 2008 implantable corrective lenses were inserted, providing a measure of correction during the 2007–08 Bobsleigh World Cup season; he led his teams to three gold, three silver, and one bronze medals over that season. After Holcomb won gold at the 2010 Winter Olympics in Vancouver, Brian Boxer Wachler renamed the procedure C3-R to Holcomb C3-R, marking the first time a medical procedure was named after an Olympic athlete.

Career

Over the course of his career, Holcomb piloted his two-man ("Night Hawk") and four-man ("Night Train") US teams to a total of 12 gold medals, 6 silver medals and 9 bronze medals across Bobsleigh at the Winter Olympics, IBSF World Championships and season-long IBSF Bobsleigh World Cup final standings. His results in individual Bobsleigh World Cup races, contributing to each season's final standings, include 29 gold, 23 silver and 9 bronze medals. As of the completion of his final (2016–17) season of all international competitionsand still true as of the completion of the 2021–22 sliding seasonSteven Holcomb is the winningest American bobsled athlete in history.

Included in his success was the first US Four-man Olympic Championship title in 62 years, and the first US Four-man World Championship title in 50 years.

Olympics
It was announced on 17 January 2010 that Holcomb made the United States team in both the two-man and four-man events for the 2010 Winter Olympics. On February 17, Holcomb led the four-man US bobsled team to a gold-medal victory, ending a 62-year gold medal drought in United States Olympic four-man bobsled competition.

Holcomb qualified for the 2014 Winter Olympics in Sochi, in both the two-man and four-man bobsled. On February 16, Holcomb and brakeman Steve Langton won the bronze medal in the two-man competition, ending yet another 62-year medal drought in US Olympic two-man competition. These medals were upgraded to Silver Medals on March 27, 2019, when the IOC vacated the golds that Russian pilot Alexander Zubkov won in both the two- and four-man events due to doping. That means Holcomb, who crossed the line third in both of those races, now is a two-time silver winner in addition to the four-man gold he won at Vancouver in 2010.

World Championships, World Cup
At season-ending IBSF World Championships, Holcomb won four medals: a gold (2009 Four-man) and three bronzes (2008 Mixed team, 2009 Two-man, 2009 Mixed team).

Holcomb's successes at races during season-long IBSF Bobsleigh World Cup tournaments have resulted in numerous World Cup season titles. For the 2006–07 Bobsleigh World Cup, Holcomb won the overall 2006–07 Two-man, and 2006–07 Combined World Cup titles; the Combined title combines the results from both two-man and four-man competition, with Holcomb's second place in the 2006–07 Four-man standings contributing to his title win in the Combined standings. The 2006–07 result also made him the first American man to win the Two-man World Cup title. With strong performances throughout the 2009–10 Bobsleigh World Cup and 2013–14 Bobsleigh World Cup seasons, Holcomb won the 2009–10 Combined (his second), 2009–10 Four-man (his first),  2013–14 Combined (his third) and 2013–14 Two-man (his second) World Cup season titles.

After his success on the 2013–14 World Cup circuit and at the 2014 Olympics, Holcomb fell back in the results for the World Cup and World Championship competitions of the 2014–15 and 2015–16 seasons. He roared back in the 2016–17 Bobsleigh World Cup season, which ended on 19 March 2017, just seven weeks before Holcomb's death. During that season, Holcomb piloted his sleds to second place in the year-end 2016–17 Two-man, and third place in the year-end 2016–17 Four-man and 2016–17 Overall Combined World Cup standings.

Military service
Holcomb served as a soldier in the Utah Army National Guard for seven years, from March 1999 until July 2006. During his Army National Guard service, he served as a combat engineer in the 1457th Engineering Battalion. He took part in the U.S. Army World Class Athlete Program (WCAP) for seven years. At the end of 2006, he received an Honorable Discharge from service. While in the National Guard, he earned an Army Achievement Medal, Army Commendation Medal, Good Conduct Medal, Army Presidential Unit Citation, Army Superior Unit Award and Army Service Ribbon.

Education
Holcomb attended The Winter Sports School in Park City, graduating in 1997.

Boy Scouts
As a youth, Holcomb attained the rank of Eagle Scout in the Boy Scouts of America.

Death 
Holcomb was found dead in room 202 at the US Olympic Training Center in Lake Placid, New York, on May 6, 2017. He was 37. The initial autopsy cited fluid in Holcomb's lungs as a significant factor, while a subsequent toxicology report indicated that Holcomb had a blood-alcohol level of 0.188, along with a level of the sleeping aid Lunesta.

Holcomb had been found in his room by Katie Uhlaender, his close friend and US Olympic skeleton athlete. Holcomb and Uhlaender were featured in The Weight of Gold (2020), an HBO Sports Documentary which "explor(es) the mental health challenges that Olympic athletes often face."

References

Further reading

External links

 
 
 
 
 
 

1980 births
2017 deaths
People from Park City, Utah
Sportspeople from Utah
Sports deaths in New York (state)
American male alpine skiers
American male bobsledders
Bobsledders at the 2006 Winter Olympics
Bobsledders at the 2010 Winter Olympics
Bobsledders at the 2014 Winter Olympics
Medalists at the 2010 Winter Olympics
Medalists at the 2014 Winter Olympics
Olympic gold medalists for the United States in bobsleigh
Olympic bronze medalists for the United States in bobsleigh
United States Army soldiers
Utah National Guard personnel
U.S. Army World Class Athlete Program